Lage Raho Munna Bhai is a 2006 Indian Hindi-language satirical comedy drama film written, edited and directed by Rajkumar Hirani, who co-wrote the screenplay with Abhijat Joshi and produced by Vidhu Vinod Chopra. It is the follow-up to the 2003 film Munna Bhai M.B.B.S. with Sanjay Dutt reprising his role as Munna Bhai, a Mumbai underworld don. In Lage Raho Munna Bhai, the eponymous lead character starts to see the spirit of Mahatma Gandhi. Through his interactions with Gandhi, he begins to practice what he refers to as Gandhigiri (a neologism for Gandhism) to help ordinary people solve their problems.

Only Dutt and Arshad Warsi reprise their roles from the first film. The film also features some other actors from the first film (notably Jimmy Sheirgill and Boman Irani) but in new roles.

Lage Raho Munna Bhai released on 1 September 2006, It received widespread critical acclaim for its direction, story, screenplay, dialogues, performances of the cast and its social message and themes. The film proved to be a major box-office success, referred blockbuster grossing over  worldwide. It was second highest grossing film of the year.

At the 54th National Film Awards, Lage Raho Munna Bhai won 4 awards, including Best Popular Film Providing Wholesome Entertainment and Best Supporting Actor (Dilip Prabhavalkar). At the 52nd Filmfare Awards, the film received 12 nominations, including Best Film, Best Director (Hirani) and Best Actor (Dutt), and won 4 awards, including Best Film (Critics) and Best Comedian (Warsi). 

Lage Raho Munna Bhai also had a number of prominent screenings. It was the first Hindi film to be shown at the United Nations, and was screened at the Tous Les Cinema du Monde section of the 2007 Cannes Film Festival. The film popularized the term Gandhigiri. Vidhu Vinod Chopra submitted the film as an independent entry for the 2007 Academy Award for Best Foreign Film. It was later remade in Telugu as Shankar Dada Zindabad (2007).

Plot 
Murliprasad Sharma a.k.a. Munna Bhai, a street-wise Bombay Hindi-speaking gangster in Mumbai, is smitten with the voice of Janvi Sahni, a radio jockey. When she announces a contest on the life and beliefs of Mahatma Gandhi set for 2 October—Gandhi's birthday, with an interview with her as the prize, he is determined to win. Through the assistance of his sidekick Sarkeshwar "Circuit" Sharma, who kidnaps and bribes a group of professors, and his goons, who jam the phone lines, Munna succeeds and meets Janvi in person. During the interview, he lies that he is a history professor specializing in Gandhi and living by his principles. Having difficulty speaking formal Hindi, Munna uses much colloquial language and calls his version of Gandhism "Gandhigiri". Despite this, Janvi is impressed asks him to host a lecture on Gandhi in her home, which she has repurposed into a senior citizen community called "Second Innings House". Realizing he can't use his old tricks, Munna crams in a library to study the life and works of Gandhi in five days.

Gandhi, who Munna refers to by his nickname Bapu ("father"), starts to appear at this time and offers help and advice to Munna, who is the only person that can see him. Gandhi continues to appear each time Munna sings Raghupathi Raghava Rajaram (a song often sung in Gandhi's memory). Initially, Munna believes he is going mad, but later comes to get used to Gandhi's presence. With Gandhi's help, Munna delivers a chaotic but well-received lecture about Gandhism being only used in the name and not in practice. He then helps the seniors solve their problems through his connections and rowdyism. Lucky Singh, an unscrupulous businessman who employed Circuit and Munna to conduct "underworld" activities for him, learns that Munna is in love with Janvi and offers to help him propose to her by funding a trip to Goa for all the senior citizens. During the trip, Munna tries to confess his love to Janvi, however, they discover the trip was a ruse for Lucky to occupy the house. It turns out that Lucky's daughter, Simran, is engaged to marry Sunny, the son of Khurana, a powerful businessman. Khurana is superstitious and his activities are controlled by his astrologer, Batuk Maharaj. Maharaj's particular use of numerology led Khurana to add an extra "k" to his name and further convinced him that "Second Innings House" would be the most auspicious place for the new couple to live, hence the seizure. Further, Batuk initially advised Khurana to not go through with the wedding since Simran is a  manglik. But Lucky, not wanting to lose such an alliance, covers this up by saying that there is a mistake at the time of Simran's birth and hence the alliance progresses.

With the authorities and lawyers not willing to confront Lucky, Munna, Circuit, Janvi, and the senior citizens of Second Innings House launch a non-violent satyagraha outside Lucky's home. After a fight with Lucky's security guards, Munna and Circuit are arrested. Janvi later bails them out and invites Munna to her radio show to publicize the issue. They host a new program called "Bapu ka magic", where they offer Gandhigiri-style advice to listeners' problems, only asking that the listeners send Lucky flowers to help him recover from the "disease of dishonesty" in exchange for a unique, non-violent protest. After Munna gets his first caller, Victor D'Souza, who works as a taxi driver to repay his father's money lost in bad investments, the show gains popularity and pressure builds on Lucky, who tries and fails to offer Khurana other properties. Later, on Gandhi's insistence, Munna gives a letter to Janvi; thinking it is a love letter, Janvi instead learns the truth about Munna and leaves heartbroken, causing the protests to falter. Janvi also refuses to host the radio show with Munna. Despite this, Munna meets Lucky and assures him that he will not give up the fight. Since the radio show has gained popularity, he continues to host it on his own, offering increasingly out-of-the-box but successful solutions to listeners, much to Janvi's chagrin.

The pressure on Lucky from Khurana reaches boiling point. Lucky then tricks Munna into revealing his conversations with Gandhi before a public audience, making him seem insane. On the day of Simran's wedding, she learns the truth about her father's deception of Khurana and runs away, ending up in Victor's cab. Meanwhile, a dejected Munna and Circuit are leaving the city. However, in a drunken stupor, Munna decides not to give up on Janvi. They go to the radio station where Munna has Circuit hold the studio hostage, in an attempt to apologize to Janvi through the program. Simultaneously, Victor connects Simran to Munna, where she reveals that although she loves Sunny, she is a manglik and thus is unlucky to marry. She is also devastated by her father's wrongdoings and has always looked up to him. With Lucky, Janvi, and the senior citizens listening in, Munna convinces her to go back and tell the truth, reasoning that Khurana's belief in numerology is irrational. Simran does so and Khurana rejects her. Munna and Circuit go to the wedding and use some of their old tricks to successfully dispel Maharaj's superstitions. When Khurana still remains unmoved, Sunny refuses to listen to his father and marries Simran anyway. Munna and Circuit are arrested again. 
In jail, Janvi returns and reconciles with Munna and a grateful Lucky apologizes, promising to reform, and returns the house keys. In the end, Gandhi narrates what happens to all the other characters. Munna and Janvi got married and continued their show. Circuit is adopted by Bomi and Tina, a newly married old couple living at the house who adopt his mannerisms. Victor achieved success, finally earning enough money to buy a taxi of his own, making his father proud. Sunny and Simran remained happily married, and have a child, prompting Khurana to renounce his belief in numerology and fire Batuk. 
The film ends with a reformed Lucky sitting in the very same library in which Munna sat, reading up on Gandhi, and Gandhi begins to appear to him too.

Cast

Production 
The Munna Bhai series began after Vidhu Vinod Chopra agreed to produce Rajkumar Hirani's 2003 film Munna Bhai M.B.B.S. when no one else would (Hirani had worked as an editor on Chopra's 2000 film Mission Kashmir). They also collaborated on the script. Munna Bhai M.B.B.S. was a runaway success that prompted the duo to contemplate a sequel. The sequel was initially known as Munna Bhai Meets Mahatma Gandhi and was later titled Munna Bhai: 2nd Innings before the title Lage Raho Munna Bhai was finalized.

In an interview, Hirani admitted that he felt the burden of expectation while writing the screenplay for Lage Raho Munna Bhai, as he had to create "something to match" the first film. Initially, there was some effort to incorporate scenes or characteristics of the first film into the sequel (such as the idiosyncratic laugh of Asthana, portrayed by Boman Irani in the first installment), but the risks of repetition were consciously averted.

One of Hirani's goals in making the film was to revive an interest in Mahatma Gandhi, a figure who he felt had been forgotten in contemporary India. To highlight this fact, Hirani recounted (during an interview) an incident with a chaiwala boy (who brings tea to the crew) during production:

The boy was curious, he was a big Munna Bhai fan and kept asking for the name of the film. The first working title was Munna Bhai Meets Mahatma Gandhi and Shantanu (Moitra, the music director) told him. So he said, 'Munna Bhai to theek hai, yeh Mahatma Gandhi Kaun hai?' ('Munna Bhai is fine, but who is this Mahatma Gandhi?') So this is the sad state of affairs today. I was shocked. And it's not just the chai-wallah. A few days ago on TV a lot of politicians were asked India-related questions on the news channels, and I can't believe a lot of them don't know 2 October is Gandhiji's birthday! Many didn't know his first name. They kept saying, 'what's in a name, we respect his ideals,' but come on! How can you not know his name?

The other screenwriter, Abhijat Joshi (who teaches in the department of English at Otterbein College in Westerville, Ohio), stated that he had been conducting extensive research on Gandhi, which inspired producer Chopra to involve Joshi in the creation of the second Munna Bhai screenplay.

While writing the screenplay, Hirani and Joshi stayed together for more than 4 months. They developed scenes by going out for a walk and discussing the scene. They would not return home until they had created a scene that would make them laugh, cry, or have some provocative thought. While there was a shortage of resources during the shooting of Munna Bhai M.B.B.S., the crew did not encounter a financial crisis during the filming of Lage Raho Munna Bhai, as the team managed to receive whatever was deemed necessary (including a Jimmy Jib, a specific kind of camera crane, just for a single crane shot). The film was shot on location in and around Mumbai, with Goa as a backdrop for the "Aane Charaane" song.

Only 2 characters—those of Munna Bhai (portrayed by Sanjay Dutt) and Circuit (portrayed by Arshad Warsi)—were retained from Munna Bhai M.B.B.S. Several actors from Munna Bhai M.B.B.S., appeared in Lage Raho Munna Bhai as different characters. Vidya Balan was chosen to play the leading lady Jahnavi as her voice was thought to be appropriate for that of a radio jockey.

The actors used several techniques to develop their characters. Warsi encountered some initial problems reviving his character from the first film. Hirani recalled that on the first day of the shoot when Warsi said his first line, "he didn't sound like Circuit at all. He sounded like Arshad Warsi speaking with an accent." Warsi admitted that he had "forgotten" the character of Circuit and had to watch the DVD of Munna Bhai M.B.B.S. 3 times before being able to film the scene correctly. Dutt also confessed that he had to watch the first film 8 to 9 times to recapture the "persona" of Munna Bhai. In addition, Dutt stated in an interview that he did not read Gandhi's autobiography The Story of My Experiments with Truth as a preparation for Lage Raho Munna Bhai. Rather, he comments, his father, Sunil Dutt (who portrayed Munna Bhai's father in Munna Bhai M.B.B.S.) and his mother (the late actress Nargis) were his role models as they "were basically Gandhians. We were brought up with those values."

Dilip Prabhavalkar, who portrays Gandhi, read Gandhi's works "once again" to prepare for his role. Boman Irani prepared for the role of Lucky Singh by spending time with Sardarjis (male Sikhs) in auto spare parts shops to research his role. Vidya Balan met with a couple of radio jockeys and watched them at work.

Themes and impact

Influences and allusions 
Each film in the Munna Bhai series features Munna and Circuit in a story that is comprehensive unto itself and is not continued or referred to in another in the series. Director Hirani has compared this format to the films of Charlie Chaplin and Laurel and Hardy, as well as to the James Bond series. Others have also likened the series to the work of Laurel and Hardy. Some, however, have negated this comparison, stating that the series is more akin to the Road to... "buddy films" of Bob Hope and Bing Crosby. Hirani stated that his work was deeply inspired by the films of Hrishikesh Mukherjee.

Social influence 
The interaction between the central characters of Mahatma Gandhi and Munna Bhai highlights concepts and ideas that draw upon the period of Colonial India and the Indian independence movement. Gandhi was a leader in this movement, challenging the British Empire's presence in India through the use of Satyagraha (non-violence). In the film, Jahnavi and Munna Bhai's non-violent protest against Lucky Singh serves as a metaphor for the Indian independence movement and the battle against the British Raj.

The thematic attention to Gandhi's theories in Lage Raho Munna Bhai revived an interest in Gandhism in India under the new term Gandhigiri and "made Gandhi suddenly hip" with Indians "staging non-violent protests, starting websites, handing out roses to enemies and putting on peaked white caps from the Gandhi era." Arunabha Ghosh, in December 2006, noted in The Economic and Political Weekly that, "Gandhi, the man, was once the message. In the India of the post-liberalization brand, Gandhigiri is the message." Amelia Gentleman of New York Times stated in September 2006 that:

"The real excitement was a Bollywood film [...] which [became] the unexpected box-office hit of the year [...] With its big Bollywood soundtrack and dance routines, the movie brings Gandhi firmly into the mainstream and theatres have been packed for the past 3 weeks. The Congress Party recommended that all party members see the film. The Delhi authorities declared that tickets to the film would be sold tax free because of its assiduous promotion of Gandhian values."

Mark Sappenfield of The Christian Science Monitor argued in 2006 that the film was appealing because, "Gandhi gets his hands dirty. He appears as an apparition only visible to the wayward gangster, counselling him on how to help others deal with everyday problems." Swati Gauri Sharma suggested in The Boston Globe that what the United States "needs is a film that encourages people to take up Gandhigiri, Kinggiri, or Kennedygiri. If it worked for Bollywood, it could work for Hollywood."

Gandhigiri-style protests 

After the release of the film, Gandhigiri-style protests began to take place in India. In 2006, farmers staged a protest with flowers in the Vidarbha region, and people who organised a protest in Lucknow claimed to have been inspired by Lage Raho Munna Bhai to use roses to convey their message. In Lucknow, students claimed to have been inspired by Lage Raho Munna Bhai to do volunteer work, planting trees "to conserve nature which is bound to benefit public health." Mafia don Babloo Srivastava claimed to have been inspired by Lage Raho Munna Bhai to distribute roses as a "message of love and peace". In 2008, Indian Greenpeace activists delivered thousands of roses to Ratan Tata, chairman of Tata Motors, to reconsider his plans of building a port at the nesting grounds of olive ridley sea turtles. The "Send Pramod Muthalik a Valentine's Day card" campaign in 2009 was inspired by the film.

In the United States during July 2007, Aman Kapoor, founder of the Immigration Voice forum, initiated a Gandhigiri protest inspired by Lage Raho Munna Bhai. Over a three-day period, hundreds of flower bouquets were sent to the United States Citizenship and Immigration Services (USCIS) office by Indians who were legally in the US but caught in a green card backlog. On 17 July, the USCIS reversed the decision that led to the protest.

Impact 
Lage Raho Munna Bhai revived an interest in books about Gandhi. In particular, demand for Gandhi's autobiography My Experiments with Truth increased after the film debuted, including requests from prison inmates. In addition, due to its influence, the film was made tax-free in Mumbai.

Release

Screenings 
Screened on 10 November 2006 in the United Nations auditorium, Lage Raho Munna Bhai was the first Hindi film to be shown at the UN. The film was introduced by Shashi Tharoor, UN Under-Secretary General for Communications and Public Information. Taran Adarsh of Bollywood Hungama observed that, "there was a thunderous applause at the high points of the film, like the pensioner shedding his clothes. The applause at the end of the screening was unending. A vibrant Q&A session followed with director Rajkumar Hirani, writer Abhijat Joshi and actor Boman Irani, who flew to the U.S. for the screening." The Indo-Asian News Service (IANS) noted that, "an evening that had started with massive security arrangements in the sombre UN setting, concluded in a festive atmosphere in the lounge of the UN with diplomats from other tables joining in raising a toast for the film." The United Nations General Assembly announced on 15 June 2007 that 2 October, the day of Gandhi's birth (Gandhi Jayanti), was to be "the International Day of Non-Violence."

The Prime Minister of India, Manmohan Singh, was given a private screening of Lage Raho Munna Bhai. After viewing the film, he stated that it "captures Bapu's message about the power of truth and humanism." In a speech during his visit to South Africa, Singh said, "I was heartened to see recently that back home in India the most popular movie this festival season is a film about a young man's discovery of the universal and timeless relevance of the Mahatma's message." Singh announced the creation of a new Public Services Bill to combat corruption in a press release dated 17 November 2006, and cited Lage Raho Munna Bhai as one of its influences.

Lage Raho Munna Bhai was further screened at a global judiciary summit in Lucknow in December 2006. After viewing the film, Justice Kenneth Mithyane from South Africa commented, "The movie has re-enlivened the non-violence philosophy practiced by Mahatma Gandhi who continues to remain close to the hearts of the South Africans." Fatima Chouhan, a young member of the South African parliament, noted that, "Lage Raho Munna Bhai will be widely appreciated in South Africa. I'm carrying a couple of video discs for my family and friends."

It was part of the Tous Les Cinema du Monde section of the 2007 Cannes Film Festival. Lage Raho Munna Bhai was well received as the audience had lined "up in long queues to catch the film that had been strongly recommended in festival reviews [...] not one person who entered the screening left before the end of the 2-hours-30-minutes film." In addition, "the screening of the movie at the festival saw people sitting on the aisles as the theatre was completely packed [...] there was also a big group of French students that clapped till the credits were finished."

Several universities held screenings. It was shown on 27 October 2006 at the University of Southern California School of Cinematic Arts. The screening was followed by a question and answer session with Vidhu Vinod Chopra, Rajkumar Hirani, and Abhijat Joshi. Filmmaker Gurinder Chadha attended and spoke at the conclusion of the question-and-answer session. The film was screened at Old Dominion University on 20 March 2007 (as a part of Old Dominion University and City of Norfolk OnFilm Festival), the Massachusetts Institute of Technology Lecture Series Committee on 23 & 24 March 2007, and Harvard Law School on 3 April 2007 (as part of a series on nonviolence).

Home media and screenplay 
The British DVD of Lage Raho Munna Bhai contains a bonus DVD which has a 98-minute 5-part documentary on the making of the film, interviews with members of the cast and crew, and information on the creation of the song and dance numbers. It also has a special feature called "Munna Meets Bapu".

Lage Raho Munna Bhai – The Original Screenplay was released in December 2009. Published by Om Books International in association with Vinod Chopra Films, it was launched at an event with the original cast and crew. The text includes an introductory note by Abhijat Joshi which details the drafting of the screenplay. It also includes a number of stills from the film as well as character profiles. The film is available on Netflix.

Reception

Critical response 
Lage Raho Munna Bhai received critical acclaim upon release. Subhash K. Jha said that "Munna and Circuit, arguably cinema's most adorable and roguish reformists since Laurel and Hardy go about the business of generating humour out of the pathos of the human condition. The sequences, all fiercely and famously path-breaking have us in splits [...] Watch the lovelorn Munna Bhai answer a Gandhian quiz on a phone-in radio quiz with the help of kidnapped professors' it's one of the most comically animated sequences seen in the movies of the new millennium." Taran Adarsh of Bollywood Hungama gave the film 4 out 5 stars, describing it as "a sparkling example of qualitative cinema" arguing that it "not only entertains, it also enlightens." Nikhat Kazmi of The Times of India observes that "Vidhu Vinod Chopra gives the great Indian family one more let's-go-goodwill-hunting entertainer, even as director Raju Hirani proves that sequels needn't have the been there-done that feel..." Rajeev Masand of CNN-IBN gave it 4 out of 5 stars and states: "Like those good old-fashioned Hrishikesh Mukherjee films, it also reinforces the importance of human goodness and basic niceties. Even if you might argue that some of Gandhi's principles seem outdated today, you cannot help but cheer for Munna and his gang as they achieve the impossible with love and kindness. And that is where this film transcends conventional boundaries. It entertains you, yes, but it also makes you yearn for a perfect world. Judge it by any yardstick that you may, Lage Raho Munna Bhai emerges a clear winner. Much of that credit must go to its actors who pull out all stops to make it an enjoyable ride." Poonam Joshi of the BBC gave 4 out of 5 stars stating that, "everything about this film works [...] It's rare to see a film that bounces between humour and sentiment so seamlessly. And it is rarer still to see characters become etched in the memory so enduringly that audiences become almost protective of them. It's testimony both to the quality of the writing and the performances, that Munna and Circuit have taken on a life of their own." Vinayak Chakravorty of The Hindustan Times gave 4 out of 5 stars stating that it "cleverly works its way around the obvious hurdle that almost all sequels face: The film recreates an original milieu without a hint of the déjà-vu downer. And that precisely ranks Lage Raho Munna Bhai as one of the best entertainers this year." He commended it for showing "the heights Hindi cinema can scale despite staying within its masala parameters. Lage raho, guys!" Phelim O'Neill of The Guardian gave the film 4 out of 5 stars noting that, "as western romantic comedies become more vapid and even stalkerish, this delivers a credible message of peace, while never forgetting to be magnificent entertainment." Shastri Ramachandaran of The Tribune wrote, "True, there have been memorable films on Mahatma Gandhi by distinguished directors, namely Richard Attenborough and Shyam Benegal;one offering a respectful cinematic acquaintance and the other being didactic but inspiring. For all their earnestness, neither film stirred the popular imagination like LRM has done now." Vaidyanathan from BBC declared that, "Lage Raho is not only as good as MBBS, but much better" calling it "a brilliant emotional roller coaster ride." Jeremy Page of The Times discussed its enormous popularity upon release and noted the "serious point [the film made] about the need for tolerance, restraint and self-sacrifice."

Other critics offered more negative reviews. Ajit Duara argues in The Hindu that "the accomplished cultural sophistication and political genius of Mohandas Karamchand Gandhi has to be dumbed down to the astoundingly moronic levels of Lage Raho Munna Bhai." Filmmaker Jahnu Barua was also critical, stating that "Gandhian philosophy is serious business and Lage Raho Munna Bhai is not the right way to show it." Jug Suraiya of The Times of India wrote that "thanks to Munna Bhai, at best what exists of Gandhism is Gandhigiri, a watered-down, Dale Carnegie's How to Win Friends and Influence People version of the original."

Other response 
Filmmaker Kabir Khan cited Lage Raho Munna Bhai as a model film for him as it "had an issue, but it was never once in your face. Rajkumar Hirani kept it all so subtle and yet conveyed the message so well. It was as commercial as it gets and audiences too were thoroughly entertained. That's the way to make movies because it not just made all parties happy but also had a satisfied director at the end of it all."

According to Tushar Gandhi, Gandhi's great-grandson, it introduced the philosophies of Gandhi to a new generation, adding that "Bapu would've spoken the language of Gandhigiri if he were alive today. I really feel this film says something that needs to be told."

Box office 
Lage Raho Munna Bhai was the fourth highest-grossing Bollywood film of 2006, earning  gross in India alone and was rated a "blockbuster". The film collected a further  during 2007 as the film enjoyed a tremendous golden jubilee run playing at a selected 210 cinemas until October of that year, being the only film to achieve this feat since Dilwale Dulhania Le Jayenge (1995).

Accolades 

Lage Raho Munna Bhai is the recipient of 4 National Film Awards in addition to other awards. Some speculated that it would represent India as an entry for the 2007 Academy Award for Best Foreign Film. Although ultimately losing to Rang De Basanti as India's official submission, the producers submitted it as an independent entry. However, neither film received an Oscar nomination.

Soundtrack 

The music of Lage Raho Munna Bhai was composed by Shantanu Moitra and the lyrics were written by Swanand Kirkire. Swanand Kirkire won the National Film Award for Best Lyrics in 2007 for the song "Bande Mein Tha Dum." According to the Indian trade website Box Office India, with around  units sold, this film's soundtrack album was the year's fourteenth highest-selling.

The melody of the track "Pal Pal.... Har Pal" was lifted from Cliff Richard and The Shadows song "Theme for a Dream"

Sequel 
Vidhu Vinod Chopra announced on 29 September 2016 that production on the third Munna Bhai film starring Dutt in the title role would begin in 2017.

See also 

 List of artistic depictions of Mahatma Gandhi

Notes

References

Further reading 

 "Attenborough responsible for 'Lage Raho Munnabhai': Rajkumar Hirani." Daily News and Analysis, 21 November 2014.
 Chaturvedi, Anshul. "College, masti & Gandhigiri." The Times of India. 2 October 2008.
 Ghosh, Sohini (October 2006). "Ways of seeing:Rang De Basanti, Lage Raho Munna Bhai. Evoking idealism or validating violence?" Communalism Combat 119
 WBUR-FM, "Singing The Praises Of Bollywood Films," 25 February 2009 (transcript and audio).
 Yelaja, Prithi. "Kids take Gandhi's words to heart." Toronto Star, 2 October 2007.

External links 

 Official website
 

 

2006 films
2006 comedy-drama films
Films set in Mumbai
2000s Hindi-language films
Cultural depictions of Mahatma Gandhi
Films featuring a Best Supporting Actor National Film Award-winning performance
Films shot in Mumbai
Hindi films remade in other languages
Indian comedy-drama films
Films scored by Shantanu Moitra
Indian sequel films
Best Popular Film Providing Wholesome Entertainment National Film Award winners
Films whose writer won the Best Original Screenplay National Film Award
Films directed by Rajkumar Hirani
2006 comedy films
2006 drama films